
Gmina Kwilcz is a rural gmina (administrative district) in Międzychód County, Greater Poland Voivodeship, in west-central Poland.

Villages
Gmina Kwilcz contains the villages and settlements of Augustowo, Chorzewo, Chudobczyce, Dąbrówka, Daleszynek, Józefowo, Karolewice, Kozubówka, Kubowo, Kurnatowice, Kwilcz, Leśnik, Lubosz, Mechnacz, Miłostowo, Mościejewo, Niemierzewo, Nowa Dąbrowa, Nowy Młyn, Orzeszkowo, Pólko, Prusim, Rozbitek, Stara Dąbrowa, Stary Młyn, Upartowo, Urbanówko and Wituchowo.

Neighbouring gminas
Gmina Kwilcz is bordered by the gminas of Chrzypsko Wielkie, Lwówek, Międzychód, Pniewy and Sieraków.

References

External links
Polish official population figures 2006

Kwilcz
Międzychód County